This article lists the confirmed national futsal squads for the 2008 FIFA Futsal World Cup tournament held in Brazil, between 30 September and 19 October 2008.

Group A

Head coach:  Paulo de Oliveira

Head coach:  Elddys Valdes

Head coach:  Sergio Sapo

Head coach:  Oleg Ivanov

Head coach:  Victor Waiia

Group B

Head coach:  Alessandro Nuccorini

Head coach:  Rubén Subeldía

Head coach:  Orlando Duarte

Head coach:  Jose María Pazos

Head coach:  Keith Tozer

Group C

Head coach:  Sergio López

Head coach:  Farinha

Head coach:  Moafak El-Sayed

Head coach:  Carlos Estrada

Head coach:  Gennadiy Lisenchuk

Group D

Head coach:  Tomáš Neumann

Head coach:  Hossein Shams

Head coach:  Mato Stanković

Head coach:  Venancio López

Head coach:  Gustavo Sánchez

External links
 Official website

S
FIFA Futsal World Cup squads